Mustafa Ceceli (born 2 November 1980) is a Turkish singer.

Career
His musical career started with an amateur high school band. After high school, he attended to Ankara University Faculty of Veterinary. In third class, he left this faculty, he took the university entrance exams second time and he attended Yeditepe University Management department.

His professional music career has started after meeting Ozan Doğulu and with his various arrangements for Sezen Aksu. His first album was released in 2009 with the title also bearing his own name. Mustafa Ceceli has co-produced, arranged or performed over twenty top ten hits in Turkish charts.

He has twice won the Turkey Music Awards. They were in the categories of "Best Album" and "Best Male Artist". He received the awards in 2010 and 2014.

In 2018, Ceceli composed the melody for  "The Turkey Anthem", a song for the Turkish invasion of Afrin on request of the Turkish president Recep Tayyip Erdogan.

Discography

Albums
Studio albums
2009: Mustafa Ceceli
2012: Es
2014: Kalpten
2015: Aşk İçin Gelmişiz
2017: Zincirimi Kırdı Aşk

Compilation albums
2013: Mustafa Ceceli 5. Yıl
2016: Mustafa Ceceli Koleksiyon

Remixes
2010: Mustafa Ceceli Remixes
2011: Eksik Remix 2011
2012: Es+ Remixes

EPs
2017: Simsiyah

Singles
As lead artist

 "Limon Çiçekleri" (2009)
 "Hastalıkta Sağlıkta" (2010)
 "Eksik" (with Elvan Günaydın) (2011)
 "Es" (2012)
 "Söyle Canım" (2013)
 "Emri Olur" (2016)
 "Aşkım Benim (2015)
 "Zincirimi Kırdı Aşk (2017)
 "İyi ki Hayatımdasın" (2017)
 "Maşallah" (2017)
 "Kıymetlim" (with İrem Derici) (2017)
 "Anlarsın" (with Sinan Akçıl) (2018)
 "Yaz Bunu Bir Kenara" (2019)
 "Bedel" (2019)
 "Saçma Sapan" (2020)
 "Ki Sen" (2020)
 "Gün Ağarmadan" (with Irmak Arıcı) (2020)
 "Rüyalara Sor" (2020)
 "Rüyalara Sor" (feat. Ece Mumay) [Acoustic] (2020)
 "Öptüm Nefesinden" (feat. Ekin Uzunlar) (2020)
 "Ölümlüyüm" (2021)
 "Başaramadım" (2021)
 "Rüzgar" (with Bilal Hancı) (2021)
 "Leyla Mecnun" (with Burak Bulut & Kurtuluş Kuş) (2021)
 "İmtiyaz" (with JİNE) (2021)
 "Tut Elimden" (2021)
 "Canım" (with Yaşar İpek) (2021)
 "Salıncak" (feat. Nigar Muharrem, Burak Bulut & Kurtuluş Kuş) (2022)
 "Varsa Eşq" (with Şöhret Memmedov) (2022)
 "Gerçekten Zor" (2022)
 "Yıkamazsın" (2022)
 "Rastgele" (with İrem Derici, Burak Bulut & Kurtuluş Kuş) (2022)
 "Dayan" (with Semicenk) (2022)
 "İlla" (with Indira Elemes) (2022)
 "Gelme Üstüme" (2022)
 "Sargı" (with Nigar Muharrem, Burak Bulut & Kurtuluş Kuş) (2022)
 "Zaman" (with Bengü) (2022)

As featured artist
 "Unutamam" (with Enbe Orkestrası) (2007, from the album Enbe Orkestrası)
 "Karanfil" (2008, from the album Uzay Heparı Sonsuza)
 "Hata" (with Ozan Doğulu) (2010, from the album 130 Bpm)
 "Eksik" (with Enbe Orkestrası and Elvan Günaydın) (2010, from the album Kalbim)
 "Yarabbim" (2012, from the album Orhan Gencebay ile Bir Ömür)
 "Haram Geceler" (with Ozan Doğulu) (2014, from the album 130 Bpm Moderato)
 "Sarı Saçlarından Sen Suçlusun" (2014, from the album Kayahan'ın En İyileri No.1)
 "Aşığız" and "Mavi Mavi" (with Sinan Ceceli) (2017, from the album Söyle)
 "Merdo" (with Yiğit Mahzuni) (2017, from the album Mahzuni'ye Saygı)
 "Sana Değer" (2018, from the album Yıldız Tilbe'nin Yıldızlı Şarkıları)
 "Düşünme Hiç" (2019, from the album Fikret Şeneş Şarkıları)
 "Çok Sevmek Yasaklanmalı" (with İrem Derici and Sinan Akçıl) (2020, from the album Piyanist)
 "Eve Giremiyorum" (with Sinan Akçıl) (2020, from the album Piyanist)
 "İçime Atıyorum" (with Ziynet Sali) (2021, from the album Yaşam Çiçeği)
 "Durum Çok Acil" (with Sinan Akçıl and Merve Özbey) (2022, from the album Piyanist 2)
 "Beni Unut" (2022, from the album Serdar Ortaç Şarkıları, Vol. 1)

Other duets
 "Şeker" (with Ravi İncigöz) (2014)
 "Kış Masalı" (with Sibel Can) (2014)
 "Untuk Cinta" (with Siti) (2016)
 "Aşk Haklıyı Seçmiyor" (with Sera Tokdemir) (2018)
 Turkey Anthem (on request by the Turkish president Recep Tayyip Erdogan) 
 "Mühür" (with Irmak Arıcı) (2019)
 "Ben de Özledim" (with Bahadır Tatlıöz, Aydın Kurtoğlu, and Gülden) (2020)
 "Dünya" (with Tohi and Sinan Akçıl) (2020)

International

*Did not appear in the official Belgian Ultratop 50 charts, but rather in the bubbling under Ultratip charts.

Charts

Television 
 O Ses Çocuklar – Judge – 2014
 Kapışma – Judge – 2015

References

External links

Living people
1980 births
Musicians from Ankara
Turkish pop singers
Turkish composers
21st-century Turkish singers
21st-century Turkish male singers